is a former Japanese actress who was represented by the talent agency Stardust Promotion.

Biography
In 2010, Ohsawa is affiliated with her current office, Stardust Promotion.

Her first starring role is the stage play, Pool Side Story, and later appeared in theater plays, films, and television dramas. In stage, Ohsawa has starring roles in plays such as Jū oni no Kizuna: Sekigahara Kitan Koi Mai.

From January 11, 2014, she served as a reporter of King's Brunch.

Filmography

TV series

Films

Stage play

References

External links
 Official profile 
 

21st-century Japanese actresses
1995 births
Living people
People from Tokyo
Stardust Promotion artists